Fourth-seeded Andrea Temesvári was the defending champion but went out in the semifinals to Manuela Maleeva.
Top-seed Maleeva won the final and $34,000 first prize money by defeating Lisa Bonder-Kreiss in the final.

Seeds
The top eight seeds received a bye into the second round. A champion seed is indicated in bold text while text in italics indicates the round in which that seed was eliminated.

  Manuela Maleeva (champion)
  Zina Garrison (quarterfinals)
  Lisa Bonder-Kreiss (final)
  Andrea Temesvári (semifinals)
  Helena Suková (second round)
  Sylvia Hanika (third round)
  Kathy Rinaldi (quarterfinals)
  Pam Casale (semifinals)
  Bettina Bunge (first round)
  Camille Benjamin (first round)
  JoAnne Russell (second round)
  Iva Budařová (second round)
  Rene Uys (first round)
  Terry Phelps (quarterfinals)

Draw

Finals

Top half

Section 1

Section 2

Bottom half

Section 3

Section 4

References

External links

1984 Virginia Slims World Championship Series
Women's Singles